The Intelligence Commendation Medal is awarded by the Central Intelligence Agency for the performance of especially commendable service or for an act or achievement significantly above normal duties which results in an important contribution to the mission of the Agency.

Known recipients
 James Barron
 David W. Doyle
 Scott F. Large
 Ray McGovern
 Jonna Mendez

See also 
Awards and decorations of the United States government

References

Awards and decorations of the Central Intelligence Agency